Stuart K. Holcomb (September 11, 1910 – January 11, 1977) was an American football and basketball coach best known for serving as head football coach for Miami University (1942–1943) and Purdue University (1947–1955). Before coaching, Holcomb was a starting halfback at Ohio State University and the captain of the 1931 Buckeyes football team.  Prior to arriving at Miami, Holcomb was the head football coach at three smaller schools: the University of Findlay (1932–1935), Muskingum College (1936–1940), and Washington & Jefferson College (1941).  He also served as the head basketball coach at University of Findlay for four seasons, 1932–33 through 1935–36 and at the United States Military Academy from 1945 to 1947.  After retiring from coaching, Holcomb was the athletic director at Northwestern University (1956–1966) and later the general manager of Major League Baseball's Chicago White Sox (1971–1973).

Coaching career

Miami
Holcomb was named Miami University's head football coach for the 1942 season succeeding Frank Wilton.  His first team went 3–6 which equaled the number of wins of the three previous years for the Redskins.  The next year Holcomb and the Redskins posted a winning record of 7–2–1. This team was dominated by defense, only allowing their opponents to score in double digits twice; A 34–12 win over Bradley University and a 35–0 blow out loss to Arkansas A&M. In his two years as Miami’s head coach he compiled an overall record of 10–9–1.  He left Miami to become an assistant coach for Earl Blaik at the United States Military Academy.  He was replaced as Redskins coach by future Pro and College Football Hall of Fame coach Sid Gillman who was one of Holcomb's top assistant coaches.

Army
While an assistant football coach for the United States Military Academy, Holcomb was head coach of the men’s basketball team for two seasons from 1945 through 1947.  He led the cadets to two straight winning seasons of 9–6 and 9–7.

Purdue
During Holcomb’s tenure as Boilermakers head coach he compiled a record of 35–42–4.  His best year was 1952 when he led the Boilermakers to a Big Ten Conference co-championship and a #18 ranking in the final poll. Despite having only a 4–3–2 overall record, Holcomb's team played well in conference with a 4–1–1 record.   Holcomb’s Purdue teams are, perhaps, best remembered for ending Notre Dame's 39-game unbeaten streak when his Boilermakers defeated the Irish, 28–14, in the second game of the 1950 season.  Holcomb was known for developing solid quarterbacks including Bob DeMoss, Dale Samuels and Len Dawson.  These players helped grow a strong tradition at Purdue of great quarterback play.  On December 12, 1955, after his nine seasons at Purdue, Holcomb left Purdue to accept the athletic director position at the Northwestern University

Sports administrator
Holcomb served as the Athletic Director at Northwestern from 1956-1966. He hired fellow Miami alum Ara Parseghian to be the new Wildcats head coach in 1956, and Parseghian stayed at Northwestern until accepting the head coaching job at Notre Dame following the 1963 season. One of the reasons for Parseghian's departure was his feud with Holcomb.

Holcomb was appointed as the general manager of the Chicago Mustangs, a United Soccer Association franchise owned by Arthur and John Allyn. After the Mustangs folded following the 1968 season, Holcomb was reassigned to the Chicago White Sox, another of the Allyn brothers' business entities, as its public relations director.

With the White Sox's record at 49–87 and en route to a franchise-worst 56–106 finish, Holcomb was promoted to replace Ed Short as general manager on September 1, 1970. He immediately began overhauling the ball club that month with the dismissal of Don Gutteridge on the 2nd and the hiring of Chuck Tanner and Roland Hemond from the California Angels as manager and director of player personnel respectively two days later on the 4th.

Death
Holcomb died of a heart attack, on January 11, 1977, in Venice, Florida.

Family
Holcomb's three sons played college football: Chip at Northwestern University, Doug at Purdue University, and Bryan at Arizona State University and Florida State University.

Head coaching record

Football

References

1910 births
1977 deaths
American football halfbacks
Army Black Knights football coaches
Army Black Knights men's basketball coaches
Chicago White Sox executives
Findlay Oilers football coaches
Findlay Oilers men's basketball coaches
Major League Baseball general managers
Miami RedHawks football coaches
Muskingum Fighting Muskies football coaches
Muskingum Fighting Muskies men's basketball coaches
Northwestern Wildcats athletic directors
Ohio State Buckeyes football players
Purdue Boilermakers football coaches
Washington & Jefferson Presidents football coaches
Sportspeople from Erie, Pennsylvania
Coaches of American football from Pennsylvania
Players of American football from Pennsylvania
Basketball coaches from Pennsylvania